Kuntuyuq or Quntuyuq (Quechua kuntu, quntu fragrance, aroma, -yuq a suffix, "the one with a fragrance", Hispanicized spelling Contuyog, Cuntuyog) is an archaeological site with rock paintings on a mountain of the same name in Peru. It lies in the Pasco Region, Daniel Alcides Carrion Province, Chacayan District, in the community of Iskayqucha (Quechua for "two lakes", Hispanicized Iscaycocha), north-west of the lake Allqaqucha.

See also 
 Yuraq Mach'ay

References 

Archaeological sites in Pasco Region
Archaeological sites in Peru
Rock art in South America
Mountains of Peru
Mountains of Pasco Region